Oleg Alekseyevich Pashinin (born 12 September 1974) is a Uzbekistani football coach and a former defender. He works as an analyst with Lokomotiv Moscow.

Coaching career
On 6 March 2022, Pashinin was appointed caretaker manager for FC Lokomotiv Moscow for the game against FC Khimki. For the next game, Dmitri Loskov returned to the position. On 5 April 2022, Lokomotiv announced that Pashinin left the coaching staff and will continue to work at the club at a different position.

Club statistics

National team statistics

Honors
Russian Premier League (2): 2002, 2004
Russian Cup (5): 1996, 1997, 2000, 2001, 2007
Russian Super Cup (1): 2003
Commonwealth of Independent States Cup (1): 2005

References

External links

1974 births
People from Tambov Oblast
Living people
Russian footballers
Russian people of Uzbekistani descent
Uzbekistani footballers
Uzbekistani expatriate footballers
Uzbekistan international footballers
FC Lokomotiv Moscow players
Sanfrecce Hiroshima players
Expatriate footballers in Japan
Uzbekistani expatriate sportspeople in Japan
J1 League players
Uzbekistani expatriate sportspeople in Russia
Expatriate footballers in Russia
Russian Premier League players
Russian football managers
FC Lokomotiv Moscow managers
Russian Premier League managers
Association football defenders
Sportspeople from Tambov Oblast